6 and 7 Precentor's Court are an historic pair of buildings in the English city of York, North Yorkshire. Grade II listed structures, standing on Precentor's Court, the buildings date to the mid-19th century, with number 7 having earlier origins. The properties were renovated in the 20th century.

Rachael Epworth, a pawnbroker, formerly lived at the property. Henry Hardcastle purchased the property from her. A. Ayer Carr, a new member of the Yorkshire Philosophical Society, was living at number 6 in 1900.

References

Precentor's Court
Houses in North Yorkshire
19th-century establishments in England
Precentor's Court 6 and 7
Grade II listed houses